The Vestries Act 1850 (13 & 14 Vict. c. 57.), "An Act to prevent the holding of Vestry or other Meetings in Churches, and for regulating the Appointment of Vestry Clerks", was legislation to regulate the local government of parishes in England and Wales.

The vestry of a parish could resolve to request that the Poor Law Board (later updated to Local Government Board) would order that suitable accommodation would be provided within a year of the order so vestry meetings would take place outside of the parish church. A paid vestry clerk could be appointed using a similar mechanism.

The act was repealed by the London Government Order 1965.

References

United Kingdom Acts of Parliament 1850